"Edge of Thorns" is a song by American progressive metal band Savatage. The song was released as the promo lead single from the band's seventh album Edge of Thorns. The single is Savatage's first song to feature new vocalist Zachary Stevens.

"Edge of Thorns" is Savatage's only charting single in America, peaking at #26 on the Mainstream Rock chart.

About
As with the rest of the album, drummer Steve "Doc" Wacholz recorded the song using electronic drums.

The song's opening piano riff was extensively used in the 1994 MTV reality show The Real World: San Francisco in scenes involving Pedro Zamora's hospitalization.

Music video
The song's music video takes place in a jungle and cuts back and forth between shots of wildlife and the band performing the song.

Track listing

Personnel
Savatage
 Zachary Stevens – vocals
 Criss Oliva – guitars
 Johnny Lee Middleton – bass guitar
 Steve "Doc" Wacholz – drums

Additional musicians
 Jon Oliva – piano, keyboards

References

1993 singles
1993 songs
Savatage songs
Atlantic Records singles
Progressive metal songs